Bang Gang (A Modern Love Story) is a French drama film directed by Eva Husson. It was shown in the Platform section of the 2015 Toronto International Film Festival. It is Husson's directorial debut.

Plot
In Biarritz, teenager Alex temporarily lives alone (and later with his best friend Nikita) while his mother is abroad for work. In his house he organizes sex parties (called bang gangs) with other teenagers, also including recreational drug use. Videos of the parties are posted on a password-protected website. The girl George and her best friend Laetitia are active participants of the parties.  George does not like that Laetitia has sex with Alex, with whom George had sex first. Gabriel does not like to attend the parties at first, but finally goes to one to have sex with George, in a separate room. Sexually transmitted infections, a teenage pregnancy and unintended posting of the videos on YouTube make the parties known to parents and other authorities, after which they are discontinued. Gabriel and George are concerned about publicized sex videos of George. Gabriel finds the boy who posted them and forces him to remove them. The infections are easily treated. The pregnant girl has an abortion. George and Gabriel start a regular relationship.

Cast
 Finnegan Oldfield as Alex
 Marilyn Lima as George
 Daisy Broom as Laetitia
 Fred Hotier as Nikita
 Lorenzo Lefebvre as Gabriel

Reception

Critical response
On Rotten Tomatoes the film has an approval rating of 67% based on reviews from 36 critics, with an average rating of 6/10. On Metacritic the film has a score of 53 out of 100, based on 13 critics, indicating "mixed or average reviews".

Peter Debruge of Variety wrote: "The lack of a single clear character with whom to identify ultimately proves problematic."
Boyd van Hoeij of The Hollywood Reporter wrote: "Originality or insight aren’t very high on the priority list of this drama."

Accolades

References

External links
 

2015 films
2015 drama films
2015 directorial debut films
2010s French-language films
French drama films
Films directed by Eva Husson
2010s French films